What Bird Is That? is the third album by The Lucksmiths released in 1996 on Candle Records (catalogue number LUCKY4.)

Track listing
"Shine on Me" – 3:03
"Silver Friends" – 3:03
"Off with His Cardigan!" – 2:06
"Macintyre" – 2:17
"Snug" – 1:40
"Putt Putt" – 2:34
"Day in the City" – 2:24
"Housewarming" – 2:57
"The Drunkest Man in the World" – 1:50
"Twenty-Two" – 3:07
"Jennifer Jason" – 1:19
"Danielle Steel" – 2:06
"Frisbee" – 2:35
"I Am About to Sail" – 2:19

The Lucksmiths albums
1997 albums